"Private Number" is a song recorded by American soul singers Judy Clay and William Bell (1968). In the US, it was released as a single, where it peaked at number 17 on the Best Selling Rhythm and Blues chart and number 75 on the Billboard Hot 100. Outside the US, "Private Number" went to number eight in the United Kingdom.

911 version

English boy band 911 covered "Private Number" for their third studio album, There It Is (1999). There are two different versions of the song: one version featuring Natalie Jordan and one featuring Fann Wong. The song was released as the third and final single from the album on May 3, 1999, and peaked at number three on the UK Singles Chart. It was the last of their string of 10 consecutive top-10 singles in the UK.

Music video
The music video features 911 performing the song in pouring rain in China. There are two different versions of the video, one featuring Natalie Jordan and one featuring Fann Wong. In Jordan's version, she can be seen singing her parts whilst on a television screen and in a dark room. In Wong's version, she is standing by herself in the rain as well.

Track listings
UK CD1 and cassette single
 "Private Number" – 3:32
 "Celebration" – 3:43
 "Make You My Baby" – 3:09

UK CD2
 "Private Number" (orchestral version) – 3:32
 "Rock Me Gently" (acoustic version) – 3:22
 "Hold On" – 5:57

Charts

Release history

Other cover versions 
 English rock band Babe Ruth covered this song in 1975. It featured on their Stealin' Home album and was released as a single on the Harvest Records label.
 In 2000, Bell performed a live version of "Private Number" with Scottish rock band Texas on Later... with Jools Holland.
 In 2011, Jon Stevens covered the song for his album Testify!
 In 2014, Bell duetted with Joss Stone on Jools' Annual Hootenanny.
 In 2016, Beverley Knight recorded a version with Jamie Cullum for her album Soulsville. The following year, Knight performed the song with Bell at a Prom celebrating Stax Records.

Sampling 
 The opening seconds and guitar riff of Clay and Bell's original version of the song were prominently sampled in Rappin' 4-Tay's hip-hop single, "Playaz Club", which reached #36 on the Billboard Hot 100 chart in 1994.
 The opening seconds were also sampled in Pretty Lights's "Finally Moving", which is featured on his 2006 album Taking Up Your Precious Time, Nightmares On Wax's "You Wish" from his 2006 album In a Space Outta Sound, and more recently by Purple Disco Machine on "Devil in Me", featured in his 2017 album Soulmatic.

References

1968 singles
1999 singles
Virgin Records singles
911 (English group) songs
1968 songs
Male–female vocal duets
Stax Records singles
Songs written by William Bell (singer)
Songs written by Booker T. Jones